O Circo das Qualidades Humanas is a 2000 Brazilian drama film directed by Milton Alencar, Paulo Augusto Gomes, Geraldo Veloso, and Jorge Moreno. It was shot in December 1998 in Congonhas, Minas Gerais, and debuted at the 3rd Festival de Cinema de Tiradentes in 2000.

Plot 
On a Sunday morning, Ulysses, Maria Germana, Eduardo and the cronies Carioca and Preto arrive in Congonhas, Minas Gerais. Each of them has a different reason to come to the town: some personal, others professional. Ulysses was born there. Living an identity crisis, he decides to return to his hometown in a quest to find himself. Maria Germana is a shooting model that comes to Congonhas because of a photographic session. She gets interested in Ulysses after seeing him in a bar. Eduardo is an engineer whom also came because of professional reasons. He ends up falling in love with a mysterious woman named Helena, whom he met in the streets of the city. Carioca and Preto came to search for Chicão, with who they plan to have a reckoning. Besides them, there is Bosco, a young man that has returned home recently after a period recovering from substances dependency. He struggles with family problems, such as the sexual harassment from his sister, and the despise from his father.

Cast 
Daniel de Oliveira.... Bosco
Eduardo Lago.... José Ulysses de Almeida
Thaís Garayp.... D. Geralda
Francisco Milani.... Seu Antônio
Stênio Garcia.... Chicão
Henrique Pires.... Carioca
Romeu Evaristo.... Preto
Jonas Bloch.... Eduardo da Cunha Junior
Elvécio Guimarães.... Jofre
Rogério Cardoso.... Seu Nilo
Cléo Carmona .... Maria Germana
Selma Mello .... Joyce
Márcia Barros .... Jussara
Paula Burlamaqui.... Helena
Maria Olívia .... Tia Prisciliana
Regina Bahia .... Aurentina
Geraldo Carrato .... Marcos
Carl Schumacher.... Silviano
Luiz Arthur .... Fábio
Michele Castro .... Marilene
Cristina Rizzo .... Janaína
Eduardo Peixoto .... Noca
Jeane Terra .... Marlene
Eduardo Villa .... Dudu
Cássia Kiss

References

External links

2000 films
2000 drama films
Brazilian drama films
Films shot in Minas Gerais
2000s Portuguese-language films